In stable homotopy theory, a branch of mathematics, Morava K-theory is one of a collection of cohomology theories introduced in algebraic topology by Jack Morava in unpublished preprints in the early 1970s. For every prime number p (which is suppressed in the notation), it consists of theories K(n) for each nonnegative integer n, each a ring spectrum in the sense of homotopy theory.    published the first account of the theories.

Details

The theory K(0) agrees with singular homology with rational coefficients, whereas K(1) is a summand of mod-p complex K-theory. The theory K(n) has coefficient ring

Fp[vn,vn−1]

where vn has degree 2(pn − 1). In particular, Morava K-theory is periodic with this period, in much the same way that complex K-theory has period 2.

These theories have several remarkable properties.
 They have Künneth isomorphisms for arbitrary pairs of spaces: that is, for X and Y CW complexes, we have

 They are "fields" in the category of ring spectra. In other words every module spectrum over K(n) is free, i.e. a wedge of suspensions of K(n).
 They are complex oriented (at least after being periodified by taking the wedge sum of (pn − 1) shifted copies), and the formal group they define has height n.
 Every finite p-local spectrum X has the property that K(n)∗(X) = 0 if and only if n is less than a certain number N, called the type of the spectrum X. By a theorem of Devinatz–Hopkins–Smith, every thick subcategory of the category of finite p-local spectra is the subcategory of type-n spectra for some n.

See also 

 Chromatic homotopy theory
 Morava E-theory

References

Hovey-Strickland, "Morava K-theory and localisation"

Algebraic topology
Cohomology theories